This is a list of the presidents of the CERN Council, the decision-making authority of the European Organization for Nuclear Research.

List

References

Council
CERN